Trachystolodes bimaculatus is a species of beetle in the family Cerambycidae. It was described by Kriesche in 1924, originally as "Trachystola bimaculata." It is known from Vietnam.

References

Lamiini
Beetles described in 1924